Wallace Santos (born 22 July 1984) is a Brazilian para-athlete, who won gold in the shot put F55 event at the 2020 Summer Paralympics.

References

1984 births
Living people
Brazilian male shot putters
Paralympic athletes of Brazil
Paralympic gold medalists for Brazil
Athletes (track and field) at the 2020 Summer Paralympics
Medalists at the 2020 Summer Paralympics
Paralympic medalists in athletics (track and field)
Sportspeople from Rio de Janeiro (city)